Francisco Fernández Marugán (born 6 October 1946, in Cáceres, Spain) is a Spanish economist and politician for the Spanish Socialist Workers' Party (PSOE) and a long serving member of the Spanish Congress.

Married with two children, he belongs to the State Bodies of Senior Tax Inspectors and Senior State Administrators

Marugán entered national politics at the 1982 General Election when he was elected to the Spanish Congress of Deputies representing Seville Province. He changed districts for the 1986 election, returning to his native region of Extremadura and was elected for Badajoz Province being re-elected in all subsequent General elections in 1989, 1993, 1996, 2000, 2004 and 2008.

Marugán has usually been identified with the "Guerrista" sector of the PSOE (which takes its name from the veteran deputy Alfonso Guerra) and in a 2005 article supported Guerra in criticising the actions of the PSOE such as entering into a tripartite Government in Catalonia. He is also considered a close associate of former president of Extremadura Juan Carlos Rodriguez Ibarra, also identified with the Guerrista sector. Within the PSOE he served as Secretary for Economic issues and he coordinated the PSOE campaigns for both the 1986 and 1993 General Elections. Following the narrow PSOE victory at the 1993 election he served as Secretary of State for Economic and Social issues in the last PSOE government of Felipe Gonzalez which lasted until the 1996 election.

In 1999 Marugán became involved in a shouting match with the Partido Popular minister Josep Piqué in the Spanish Congress chamber which ended with Piqué calling Marugán a "hijo de puta" (son of a bitch). Since 21 July 2017, he has been the acting Ombudsman of Spain.

References

1946 births
Living people
People from Cáceres, Spain
Ombudsmen in Spain
Spanish Socialist Workers' Party politicians
Members of the 2nd Congress of Deputies (Spain)
Members of the 3rd Congress of Deputies (Spain)
Members of the 4th Congress of Deputies (Spain)
Members of the 5th Congress of Deputies (Spain)
Members of the 6th Congress of Deputies (Spain)
Members of the 7th Congress of Deputies (Spain)
Members of the 8th Congress of Deputies (Spain)
Members of the 9th Congress of Deputies (Spain)